Sir Thomas Farmer,  (born 10 July 1940) is a Scottish entrepreneur.

Early life
One of seven siblings in a devoutly Catholic family, in 1964 Farmer founded his own tyre retailing business which he sold in 1969 for £450,000. Farmer retired to the United States, but became bored and decided to find a new challenge.

Business career
Farmer returned to Edinburgh to found the Kwik Fit chain of garages in 1971. The firm grew quickly, mainly through acquisition, including opening in the Netherlands in 1975. Farmer was named Scottish Businessman of the Year in 1989. After building the chain to become the world's largest independent tyre and automotive repair specialists with over 2,000 centres operating in 18 different countries, Farmer sold the firm to Ford in 1999 for more than £1 billion. He is the first Scot to be awarded the prestigious Andrew Carnegie Medal for philanthropy. Farmer owned 90% of Hibernian, a professional football club based in Edinburgh in 2003. He invested nearly £3 million to rescue the club from receivership and he continued to fund developments of Easter Road and financial losses made by the club. Before his intervention, the club had been threatened during 1990 by an attempted takeover by Wallace Mercer, the owner of their Edinburgh derby rivals Hearts. Farmer has admitted that he has no great love of football, and he rarely attends matches. He felt it was important to the local community that Hibs should continue to exist, as he was informed by campaigners that his grandfather had saved the club from bankruptcy approximately 100 years earlier. Farmer delegated control of Hibs to other figures, such as Rod Petrie. He sold the majority ownership of Hibernian FC to American businessman Ronald Gordon in July 2019.

According to the Sunday Times Rich List in 2020, Farmer is worth an estimated £126 million.

Political activism
In 2006, Farmer donated £100,000 to the Scottish National Party to help fund their campaign for the 2007 Scottish Parliament general election. Farmer commented at the time that it was not an indication of his political allegiance but that he wanted the SNP to be able to compete financially with their better-funded political opponents. Farmer repeated his endorsement for the SNP in the 2011 election.

Personal life
Farmer lives in Edinburgh, with his wife Anne. They have one daughter, one son and four grandchildren. Farmer also owns the island of Inchkeith in the Firth of Forth.

Awards and accolades
Farmer was appointed Commander of the Royal Victorian Order (CVO) in the 2009 New Year Honours for his work as chairman of the Board of Trustees of the Duke of Edinburgh's Award. Farmer was made a Knight Commander with Star of the Order of St. Gregory the Great, and he was also knighted by Queen Elizabeth in 1997.

References

External links
 
 
 

1940 births
Living people
Businesspeople awarded knighthoods
Commanders of the Order of the British Empire
Commanders of the Royal Victorian Order
Fellows of the Royal Society of Edinburgh
Hibernian F.C. directors and chairmen
Knights Bachelor
Knights Commander with Star of the Order of St. Gregory the Great
Chairmen and investors of football clubs in Scotland
Scottish philanthropists
Scottish Roman Catholics
People from Leith
20th-century Scottish businesspeople
21st-century Scottish businesspeople
Businesspeople from Edinburgh
People educated at St Augustine's High School, Edinburgh